Pretty Mrs. Smith is a lost 1915 American comedy silent film directed by Hobart Bosworth and written by Elmer Blaney Harris and Oliver Morosco. The film stars Fritzi Scheff, Louis Bennison, Forrest Stanley, Owen Moore and Lela Bliss. The film was released on March 29, 1915, by Paramount Pictures.

Plot

Cast 
Fritzi Scheff as Pretty Mrs. Drucilla Smith
Louis Bennison as Mr. Smith No. 1, Ferdinand
Forrest Stanley as Mr. Smith No. 2, Forrest
Owen Moore as Mr. Smith No. 3, Frank
Lela Bliss	as Letitia Proudfoot

See also
List of Paramount Pictures films

References

External links 
 
 

1915 films
1910s English-language films
Silent American comedy films
1915 comedy films
Paramount Pictures films
American black-and-white films
Lost American films
American silent feature films
1915 lost films
Lost comedy films
1910s American films